Lulham is a surname. Notable people with the surname include:

Bob Lulham (1926–1986), Australian rugby league footballer 
Edwin Lulham (1865–1940), British cricketer 

English-language surnames